Philip William August, Count Palatine of Neuburg (born 19 November 1668 in Neuburg an der Donau; died: 5 April 1693 in Zákupy) was a  Prince and Count Palatine of Neuburg.

Life 
Philip William August was the 13th from a total of 17 children of Elector Palatine Philip William (1615-1690) from his second marriage to Elisabeth Amalie (1635-1709), a daughter of Landgrave George II of Hesse-Darmstadt.

His oldest sister, Eleonor Magdalene married Emperor Leopold I in 1676.  In August 1689, after he had visited his brother in Breslau and his sister in Vienna, Philip William began his Grand Tour to Italy.

Philip William August chose a secular career and entered into active military service.  He died at the age of 24 after suffering for seven days from a "malignant fever" and was buried in the parish church of Zákupy.  His heart lies in the Court Church in Neuburg on the Danube.

Marriage and issue 
He married on 29 October 1690 in Raudnitz Anna Maria Franziska (1672–1741), a daughter of Duke Julius Francis of Saxe-Lauenburg.  The wedding ceremony, which had to be postponed due to the illness and death of Philip William August's father, was carried out "plainly".  His marriage brought Philipp Wilhelm August the following children:
 Leopoldine Eleanor (1691–1693).
 Maria Anna Carolina (1693–1751), married in 1719 Prince Ferdinand of Bavaria (1699–1738).

Ancestry

References 
 F. A. Förch: Neuburg und seine fürsten: ein historischer versuch als beitrag zur geschichte des fürstenthums Pfalz-Neuburg, A. Prechter, 1860, p. 95

External links 
 http://www.pfalzneuburg.de/wp-content/uploads/2010/03/PhilippWilhelmJun.pdf

Dukes of Germany
House of Wittelsbach
Counts Palatine of the Holy Roman Empire
People from Neuburg an der Donau
1668 births
1693 deaths
17th-century German people
Military personnel of the Holy Roman Empire
Sons of monarchs